Yashwantgad Fort is located in Redi, Maharashtra, near the Maharashtra-Goa border. It is located on a small hill North of Jaitapur creek. It is a tree-entangled ruin that looks out over the beaches of the south Maharashtra coast.

How to reach
The fort is located 33 km from Sawantwadi and 26 km from Vengurla. The fort is approached via crumbling gateways leading through the surrounding forest, and past a deep trench that surrounds part of the structure. Once at the main entrance you will pass through several small rooms and corridors, where tree roots cascade over the walls of the fort. These lead to the huge, roofless inner chambers of the citadel that have long since yielded to nature. Animals like langur monkeys, or drongo birds can be seen at the fort.

History
In the 610-611AD Redi was an important trading port of the Chalukya Swamiraja. Redi Fort was built by the Marathas between 1707 and 1713 part of Admiral Kanhoji Angre's line of fort defences built for Maratha Queen Tarabai Bhosale.
It was later captured by the Portuguese in 1746. The previous Citadel holders, the Sawant clan of Maharashtra, were desperate to regain the fort because of its valuable strategic position on the coast. An attempt to recapture Redi fort was preceded by poisoning the Portuguese Garrison's fish supply, but the attack was unsuccessful. The fort was eventually returned to the Sawants following a peace treaty, but the success was short-lived – in 1765 the fort was captured by the British who later sold the land to local people in 1890 while retaining ownership of the fort walls.
In 2012, the Fort was the property of Vishwanath R. Patki, whose family had been 'given the land and the fort as a "gift" by the erstwhile British government in the late 1800s, for services rendered', according to B.V. Kulkarni, Deputy Director, Directorate of Archaeology & Museums, Maharashtra. In 2016 the Fort was made a Protected Monument, and 'now it is in our control and we shall prepare a long-term conservation plan which will eventually make it a tourist attraction,' Kulkarni said.

Places to see
The area of the fort is 3 hectares. The  Fort is built on two levels - the Lower Fort, which is the larger one with its base touching the creek and a fresh water well inside, and the Upper Fort, which is smaller and on a hillock to keep watch on maritime activities in the surrounding waters. There is a dry moat 20feet deep around the fort. There are four gates to be passed to enter the fort. the entrance gates and the guard vestibules are in good condition. The balekilla or Sanctum Sanctorum is a jigsaw puzzle, there are many buildings and wards in good condition.

Gallery

See also

 Ganapati Temple, Redi

 List of forts in Maharashtra
 List of forts in India
 Sawantwadi State
 Marathi People
 List of Maratha dynasties and states
 Maratha War of Independence
 Battles involving the Maratha Empire
 Maratha titles
 Military history of India
 List of people involved in the Maratha Empire

References 

Buildings and structures of the Maratha Empire
16th-century forts in India
Buildings and structures in Maharashtra
Tourist attractions in Konkan